Amante para dos (English language:A Lover For Two) is a 1981  Argentine comedy film directed and written by Hugo Sofovich. The film starred Alberto Olmedo, Tato Bores and Moria Casán.

Plot
The film narrates the difficulties of two friends with a single lover a love triangle. Jorge Porcel also stars.

Other cast
Luisa Albinoni
Cristina Allende
Alejandra Aquino
Jorgelina Aranda
Pepe Armil
Carlos Del Burgo
Gloria Gueddes
Délfor Medina
Estela Molly
Jorge Porcel
Oscar Roy
León Sarthié
Gloria Ugarte

External links

1981 films
Argentine comedy films
1980s Spanish-language films
1981 comedy films
Films directed by Hugo Sofovich
1980s Argentine films